Hellinsia stadias is a moth of the family Pterophoridae. It is found in Brazil.

The wingspan is 20–23 mm. The head is ochreous brown, but white between the antennae. These are ochreous-whitish, with a dark fuscous line. The thorax and abdomen are ochreous-whitish. The forewings are pale whitish-ochreous. The hindwings are pale ochreous-grey. Adults are on wing in October.

References

Moths described in 1908
stadias
Moths of South America